Famous Views of the Sixty-odd Provinces (in Japanese 六十余州名所図会 Rokujūyoshū Meisho Zue) is a series of ukiyo-e prints by the Japanese artist Hiroshige (1797–1858). The series consists of a print of a famous view from each of the 68 provinces of Japan plus a print of Edo, the capital, and a contents page for a total of 70 prints. The prints were first published in serialized form by Koshimuraya Heisuke in 1853–56.

History 

Hiroshige started the series in the seventh month of Kaei 6 (Sept 1853) and completed it in the third month of Ansei 3 (May 1856).

The first 42 prints were completed and published in 1853. Thereafter, Hiroshige slowed down the pace of publishing: Buzen Province, listed as the 61st print, was issued in 1854; another seventeen were published in the 9th month of 1855; and the final nine prints in the third to fifth months of 1856.

A contents page was also published in 1856 after the final prints; The ordering of the prints on the contents page differs slightly from the actual print publication ordering. The new ordering on the contents page grouped the prints according to the 8 travel routes in Old Japan.

Hiroshige based many of his designs on old Japanese guidebooks called meishō zue. As well as several from drawings in the early volumes of the  series.

A deluxe edition featuring bokashi—additional overprinting to enrich the design—was produced as an initial run to publicize the series. Subsequent print runs tended to limit or eliminate the overprinting which was relatively costly to produce.

Format and Design 
The series uses a  layout for each of the prints. The size was the vertical ôban: 35.6 x 24.8 cm (14 x 9 3/4 in.)

This was the first time such a format had been used in a major Japanese landscape print series. A likely reason for Hiroshige's choice was that rather than travel to the actual locations, he based many of his designs on Meisho Zue guidebooks which used a vertical, rather than horizontal, format. It is also speculated by scholars that a vertical format would have been a strong marketing ploy at the time and a better binding of such a large number of prints.

The topics for the designs were famous places seen from the vantage point of a local. There is one print for each of the 68 provinces that existed at the time of the series. The print designs document a world that was about to change: A few months after the first prints were published the Black Ships that contributed to the opening of Japan arrived and just over a decade after the completion of the series, in 1872, the Meiji Restoration would rewrite the provincial boundaries that had existed since 824AD.

In addition to the prints of the provinces, there is a single print of Asakusa Fair in Edo, the capital of Japan at the time. This print would be a harbinger of Hiroshige's One Hundred Famous Views of Edo the start of which overlapped with the final prints of this series.

Key 
 No.: number of the print
 Title: as it appears on the print together with English translation and Japanese reading
 Depicted: major landmarks that appear in the print listed in order of increasing distance from the viewer
 Date: publication year and month (in the pre-1873 Japanese lunisolar calendar) according to the date seal; intercalary months are preceded with "i"
 Location: place and coordinates of the viewpoint. The coordinates are approximate—typically the coordinates of a picture element as a proxy for the viewpoint.
 Image: a picture of the print

Prints

Notes

References

External links 
  Pictures of Famous Places in the Sixty-odd Provinces [hiroshige.org.uk]

1856 prints
Print series by Hiroshige